Xinhua Township is a township of Beilin District, in the western suburbs of Suihua, Heilongjiang, People's Republic of China, located more than  west of downtown. , it has seven villages under its administration.

See also 
 List of township-level divisions of Heilongjiang

References 

Township-level divisions of Heilongjiang